The sol was a currency unit issued in Argentina. It was equal to and circulated alongside the real, with 16 soles = 1 escudo.

Coins
Silver coins were issued in denominations of ½, 1, 2, 4 and 8 soles between 1815 and 1832.

Modern obsolete currencies